The Trocadéro  was a first-rate 118-gun ship of the line of the French Navy, of the Océan type, designed by Jacques-Noël Sané.

Ordered as Formidable, she was commissioned in Toulon as Trocadéro in 1824.

On 23 March 1836, as she was refitting in Toulon, she was accidentally set afire. The fire destroyed her.

References

  L’incendie du Trocadéro à Toulon (1836), Nicolas Mioque
  La fin du Trocadéro, vaisseau de 1er rang (1836), Nicolas Mioque

Ships of the line of the French Navy
Océan-class ships of the line
1824 ships
Ship fires
Maritime incidents in March 1836
Ships built in France